Pinghua refers to two Sinitic languages from Guangxi and Hunan, China.

Pinghua may also refer to:
Pinghua, art of Chinese storytelling that emerged in the Ming period, see pingshu
Pinghua, Chinese oral literature from the Song, Yuan and Ming periods, see huaben